Ifrane is a province in the Moroccan region of Fès-Meknès. Its population in 2013 was 156,038

The major cities and towns are: 
 Ain Leuh
 Azrou
 Had Oued Ifrane
 Ifrane
 Sidi Addi
 Timahdite

Subdivisions
The province is divided administratively into the following:

References

 
Ifrane Province